Zomo the Rabbit is a 1992 book by Gerald McDermott based on a Nigerian folktale that explains why the rabbit runs so fast from other animals.

Reception
Booklist, in a starred review of Zomo the Rabbit, wrote "Wildly exuberant, full of slapstick and mischief, this version of an enduring Nigerian trickster tale is a storyteller's delight." and School Library Journal wrote "With its small but triumphant hero clad in a colorful dashiki and a cap, its dazzling design, and its great good humor, this story will be a pleasure to use with children."

Publishers Weekly called it a "straightforward retelling" and wrote "McDermott's gouache illustrations in brilliant hues of fuchsia, green and orange recall the color and geometric lines of West African textiles."

Awards
1993 National Council of Teachers of English (NCTE) Adventuring with Books book
1993-94 Alabama (Camellia) Children's Choice Picture Book Award - winner
1994 Anne Izard Storytellers' Choice Award - winner
1994 Florida Reading Association Children's Book Award - winner
1994 NCTE Kaleidoscope book
1996 Montana Treasure State Picture Book Award - winner
1996 Young Hoosier Picture Book Award - winner

References

1992 children's books
American picture books
African folklore
Books about rabbits and hares
Fictional tricksters